Sacajawea Patera is a large, elongate caldera located in Western Ishtar Terra on the smooth plateau of Lakshmi Planum, on the planet Venus. The image is centred at 64.5 degrees North latitude and 337 degrees East longitude. The depression is bounded by a zone of circumferential curvilinear structures interpreted to be graben and fault scarps. A shield edifice  in diameter with a prominent central pit lies along the trend of one of these features.

Few flow features are observed in association with Sacajawea, possibly due to age and state of degradation of the flows. Mottled bright deposits  in width are located near the periphery and in the center of the patera floor within local topographic lows. The formation of Sacajawea is thought to be related to the drainage and collapse of a large magma chamber. Gravitational relaxation may have caused the resultant caldera to sag, producing the numerous faults and graben that circumscribe the patera. Regions of complex, highly deformed tessera-like terrain are located north and east of the patera and are seen in the upper portion of the image.

References

Volcanoes of Venus